The J. Shallcross House is a historic home located at Middletown, New Castle County, Delaware.  It was built about 1885, and is a -story, five-bay, frame house constructed in a vernacular Victorian style.  It has a three bay by two bay rear wing.  The house features a three bay, wood porch on the front facade and a gable roof with dormers.

It was listed on the National Register of Historic Places in 1985. The initial nomination confused it with the A. M. Vail House and referred to it as the "J. K. Williams House"; the historical information there may not apply to this building.

References

Houses on the National Register of Historic Places in Delaware
Houses completed in 1885
Houses in New Castle County, Delaware
National Register of Historic Places in New Castle County, Delaware